The Vale of Pewsey or Pewsey Vale is an area of Wiltshire, England to the east of Devizes and south of Marlborough, centred on the village of Pewsey.

Geography
The vale is an extent of lower lying ground separating the chalk downs of Salisbury Plain to the south from the Marlborough Downs to the north. At the western end is the town of Devizes. Larger settlements in the vale include Pewsey and Burbage with many smaller villages, the larger ones including Bishops Cannings, Etchilhampton, Urchfont, Chirton, Alton Priors, Woodborough, Milton Lilbourne, Easton Royal and Wootton Rivers.

Although not itself part of the downs, the vale is included as part of the North Wessex Downs AONB (Area of Outstanding Natural Beauty).

The vale is a major east–west feature opening to the west towards the Bristol Channel, but is drained by the headwaters of the Salisbury Avon, rather than the westward-flowing Bristol Avon. The river cuts through the chalk scarp to the south at Upavon and crosses Salisbury Plain towards the south coast. The higher part of the eastern vale south of Burbage is drained by the River Bourne, which cuts the scarp at Collingbourne Kingston, joining the Avon at Salisbury. Since the area is not believed to have been glaciated, this probably indicates that the course of the rivers pre-dates the modern topography.

The highest point is Milk Hill (near Alton Barnes) at 295 m / 968 ft above sea level, with the adjacent Tan Hill summiting at 294 m / 965 ft.

The vale is not used by any major roads, but is followed by a railway and canal as a route between the London Basin and the west. To the north of Burbage the head of the Avon valley, draining west into the vale, meets the head of the River Dun, draining east to the Kennet and the Thames. The Kennet and Avon Canal and the main line railway from London to the south-west make use of this route, the canal using the Bruce Tunnel. Formerly another rail route between Andover and Marlborough also followed this gap. Another line formerly branched off towards Bath via Devizes at the western end of the vale.

Geology
The vale lies along the eroded core of an anticline, a westward extension of the Mendip Axis, with a relatively thin covering of Mesozoic sediments folded upwards over an up-faulted horst of Palaeozoic rocks. The floor of the vale is composed of  Albian (Lower Cretaceous) beds of the Upper Greensand, exposed by removal of the overlying chalk. It is surrounded to the north and south by chalk scarps which close to the east near Burbage. There is also a small inlier of Greensand to the east at Shalbourne; this area drains northwards to the Kennet.

Archaeology
Neolithic sites in the vale include Knap Hill, a causewayed enclosure near Alton Priors, first investigated by Benjamin and Maud Cunnington in 1908–9.

In 2000, near the village of Wilcot, a schoolboy found a hoard of Roman coins which became known as the Stanchester Hoard. The find is now at the Wiltshire Museum in Devizes. Since that time there have been several other Roman hoards discovered in the area.

In 2005, significant Neolithic finds and two henge sites – the Marden and Wilsford Henges – were discovered in the vale.

Extent 
According to the Pewsey Vale Local Plan prepared by Kennet District Council in 1992, the vale includes land in the following parishes: Alton, Buttermere, Burbage, Charlton, Chute, Chute Forest, Collingbourne Ducis, Collingbourne Kingston, Easton, Enford, Everleigh, Fittleton, Froxfield, Grafton, Great Bedwyn, Ham, Huish, Little Bedwyn, Manningford, Milton Lilbourne, Netheravon, North Newnton, Pewsey, Rushall, Shalbourne, Tidcombe and Fosbury, Upavon, Wilcot, Wilsford, Woodborough, and Wootton Rivers.

Notable residents, past and present 
Michael Ancram MP, 13th Marquess of Lothian
Sir Henry Howarth Bashford, physician and writer
David Brudenell-Bruce, Earl of Cardigan, 31st hereditary warden of Savernake Forest
Lord Devlin, judge
Pete Doherty, musician
Major-General Christopher Leslie Elliot
Elinor Goodman, former Channel 4 Political Editor
Brigadier Robert Hall, first Chairman of Wiltshire Council
Nick Harper, musician
Sir Henry Keswick, chairman of Jardine Matheson Holdings
Peter Lewis, HTV West newsreader
Peter Mandelson, Labour politician
David Newbigging, High Sheriff of Wiltshire, 2003
Claire Perry, former MP for Devizes
Shelley Rudman, winner of the silver medal in the skeleton bob, Britain's only medal at the 2006 Winter Olympics in Turin
Peter Sarstedt, musician
Andy Scott, musician of the band The Sweet
Jane Seymour, Queen consort of England
Nigel Stock, actor
Zoë Wanamaker, actress

Culture and sport
Pewsey is the centre of activity for many of the smaller villages in and around the Vale of Pewsey and, as such, offers a wide range of activities for its small size.

Places of interest
Avebury (stone circle), West Kennet Long Barrow, Savernake Forest, Crofton Pumping Station, Silbury Hill, Wilton Windmill, Alton Barnes (crop circles), Marlborough, Kennet and Avon Canal, Bruce Tunnel.

References

Valleys of Wiltshire